HaRav Mordechai Yitzchak HaLevi Willig (born April 25, 1947; 5th of Iyyar, 5707 on the Hebrew calendar) is an Orthodox rabbi and rosh yeshiva at Yeshiva University in Washington Heights, Manhattan.  He is often known to his students as the Ramu, which is the transliteration of the acronym of the Hebrew letters Reish, Mem, and Vav, which spell out the first letters of Rav Willig's name (Rabbi Mordechai Willig = ).

Education
Born in New York City, Rav Willig graduated from Rabbi Jacob Joseph School and received a B.A. in mathematics in 1968 from Yeshiva College and an M.S. in Jewish history in 1971 from the Bernard Revel Graduate School of Jewish Studies. He was a student of the late Rabbi Joseph B. Soloveitchik.

Professional life
In 1973, Rabbi Willig was appointed as rosh yeshiva at the Mazer School of Talmudic studies at Yeshiva University and holds that position, along with the position of rosh kollel at RIETS.

Rabbi Willig has been the rabbi and spiritual leader at the Young Israel of Riverdale Synagogue, in Riverdale, The Bronx, New York, since 1974.

During the summer, Rav Willig is the Rosh Kollel of the college in Morasha Kollel.

Rabbi Willig is also the av beis din of the Beth Din of America (https://bethdin.org/about/#rabbis), the court of the Rabbinical Council of America. He co-authored the Rabbinical Council of America's prenuptial agreement. with Rabbi Zalman Nechemia Goldberg.

Books
Rabbi Willig is the author of a sefer entitled Am Mordechai, which came out in four volumes (1992 on Brachot, 2005 on Shabbat 2010 on Seder Moed and 2016 on Shulchan Aruch).

Lanner case
In 1989, Rabbi Willig led a Bet Din that heard allegations of abuse by Rabbi Baruch Lanner.
The Bet Din found Lanner guilty of only three minor charges and found three other charges to be unsubstantiated. The Bet Din read their determination to the litigants, to the Rabbinical Council of Bergen County, and to Lanner's two employers, the Orthodox Union and a synagogue in New Milford, New Jersey.

On February 19, 2003, Rabbi Willig publicly apologized for reaching what he eventually realized to be incorrect conclusions and for other "mistakes" made during the 1989 Bet Din proceedings. He noted that since the Bet Din did not have experience adjudicating matters of abuse, they should not have agreed to take the case. A report prepared in 2000 by a special commission appointed to investigate the Orthodox Union and Rabbi Willig's Bet Din role in the Lanner case critiqued the failure of taking action and thus allowing Lanner's abusive actions to "continue unchecked for many years."

Family
Rabbi Willig resides with his wife in Riverdale, New York, New York. They have nine children and over 50 grandchildren. Four of his children live in Israel, teaching at various Yeshivos, among them Yeshivat Torat Shraga in Jerusalem, Yeshivat Mesivta Beit Shemesh in Beit Shemesh.

He is the first cousin of Rabbi Avi Weiss, who is the former senior Rabbi of the Hebrew Institute of Riverdale.  Rabbis Weiss and Willig are both part of the Vaad of Riverdale.

Notable students

References

External links
Official YU biography
Articles, audio, and video on TorahWeb.org
Shiurim by Rabbi Mordechai Willig

Yeshiva University rosh yeshivas
Modern Orthodox rabbis
American Orthodox rabbis
20th-century American rabbis
21st-century American rabbis
People from the Bronx
1947 births
Living people
Rabbis from New York City